Lely is a census-designated place (CDP) in Collier County, Florida, United States. The population was 3,451 at the 2010 census. It is part of the Naples–Marco Island Metropolitan Statistical Area.

Geography
Lely is located in western Collier County at  (26.102802, -81.733125). It is bordered on the southwest by U.S. Route 41, on the south by Naples Manor, and on the southeast by Lely Resort.

Demographics

2020 census

As of the 2020 United States census, there were 3,694 people, 1,795 households, and 1,030 families residing in the CDP.

2000 census
As of the census of 2000, there were 3,857 people, 2,037 households, and 1,179 families residing in the CDP. The racial makeup of the CDP was 97.41% White, 0.70% African American, 0.16% Native American, 0.44% Asian, 0.91% from other races, and 0.39% from two or more races. Hispanic or Latino of any race were 3.71% of the population.

There were 2,037 households, out of which 8.7% had children under the age of 18 living with them, 52.7% were married couples living together, 3.8% had a female householder with no husband present, and 42.1% were non-families. 37.8% of all households were made up of individuals, and 26.3% had someone living alone who was 65 years of age or older.  The average household size was 1.82 and the average family size was 2.33.

In the CDP, the population was spread out, with 8.1% under the age of 18, 2.8% from 18 to 24, 13.1% from 25 to 44, 25.8% from 45 to 64, and 50.2% who were 65 years of age or older.  The median age was 65 years. For every 100 females, there were 82.2 males.  For every 100 females age 18 and over, there were 80.2 males.

The median income for a household in the CDP was $45,170, and the median income for a family was $57,361. Males had a median income of $40,719 versus $31,139 for females. The per capita income for the CDP was $32,430.  About 5.1% of families and 6.3% of the population were below the poverty line, including 6.2% of those under age 18 and 8.9% of those age 65 or over.

References

Census-designated places in Collier County, Florida
Census-designated places in Florida